The Boise–Nampa, Idaho Metropolitan Statistical Area (MSA) (commonly known as the Boise Metropolitan Area or the Treasure Valley) is an area that encompasses Ada, Boise, Canyon, Gem, and Owyhee counties in southwestern Idaho, anchored by the cities of Boise and Nampa. It is the main component of the wider Boise–Mountain Home–Ontario, ID–OR Combined Statistical Area, which adds Elmore and Payette counties in Idaho and Malheur County, Oregon. It is the state's largest officially designated metropolitan area and includes Idaho's three largest cities: Boise, Nampa, and Meridian. Nearly 40 percent of Idaho's total population lives in the area.

As of the 2021 estimate, the Boise–Nampa, Idaho Metropolitan Statistical Area (MSA) had a population of 795,268, while the larger Boise City–Mountain Home–Ontario, ID–OR Combined Statistical Area (CSA) had a population of 850,341. The metro area is currently the third largest in the U.S. section of the Pacific Northwest after Seattle and Portland, and is the 75th-largest metropolitan area in the United States.

Counties

Demographics
As of the 2010 census, there were 616,561 people, 170,291 households, and 120,118 families residing within the MSA. The racial makeup of the MSA was 89.80% White, 0.52% African American, 0.80% Native American, 1.38% Asian, 0.14% Pacific Islander, 5.02% from other races, and 2.35% from two or more races. Hispanic or Latino of any race were 8.96% of the population.

The median income for a household in the MSA was $36,695, and the median income for a family was $42,196. Males had a median income of $31,854 versus $23,244 for females. The per capita income for the MSA was $17,041.

Communities

Over 200,000 inhabitants
 Boise (principal city)

50,001 to 200,000 inhabitants
 Caldwell
 Meridian
 Nampa

10,001 to 50,000 inhabitants
 Eagle
 Kuna
 Middleton
 Mountain Home
 Garden City
 Star
 Ontario, Oregon

5,001 to 10,000 inhabitants
 Emmett
 Fruitland
 Payette

1,001 to 5,000 inhabitants

 Hidden Springs
 Homedale
 Marsing
 New Plymouth
 Nyssa, Oregon
 Parma
 Wilder
 Vale, Oregon

1,000 inhabitants or fewer

 Adrian, Oregon
 Crouch
 Greenleaf
 Horseshoe Bend
 Idaho City
 Jordan Valley, Oregon
 Melba
 Notus
 Placerville

Unincorporated places

 Annex, Oregon
 Arock, Oregon
 Banks
 Basque, Oregon
 Beulah, Oregon
 Bowmont
 Bruneau
 Burns Junction, Oregon
 Cairo, Oregon
 Crowley, Oregon
 Danner, Oregon
 Garden Valley
 Hamilton Corner
 Harper, Oregon
 Huston
 Ironside, Oregon
 Jamieson, Oregon
 Jonesboro, Oregon
 Juntura, Oregon
 Letha
 Lowman
 McDermitt, Nevada-Oregon
 Murphy
 Ola
 Owyhee, Oregon
 Payette Junction, Oregon
 Riddle
 Riverside, Oregon
 Rome, Oregon
 Roswell
 Sunnyslope
 Sweet

Transportation

Airports
 Boise Airport
 Nampa Municipal Airport
 Caldwell Industrial Airport
 Mountain Home Municipal Airport

Interstates
  Interstate 84
  Interstate 184

U.S. highways
  U.S. Route 20
  U.S. Route 26
  U.S. Route 30
  U.S. Route 95

State highways
  State Highway 16
  State Highway 19
  State Highway 21
  State Highway 44
  State Highway 45
  State Highway 51
  State Highway 52
  State Highway 55
  State Highway 67
  State Highway 69
  State Highway 72
  State Highway 78
  State Highway 167
  Oregon Route 52
  Oregon Route 78
  Oregon Route 201
  Oregon Route 451
  Oregon Route 452
  Oregon Route 453
  Oregon Route 454

Mass transit
 ValleyRide

Colleges and universities

Major universities
 Boise State University (BSU), Boise, Idaho

Four-year colleges and universities
 Northwest Nazarene University (NNU), Nampa, Idaho
 The College of Idaho (C of I), Caldwell, Idaho
 University of Idaho (U of I), Boise; Extension Campus
 Idaho State University (ISU), Meridian, Idaho; Extension Campus

Community colleges and trade schools
 College of Western Idaho, Nampa, Idaho (CWI) Nampa; Main Campus, Aspen Classroom Bldg., Canyon County Extension Boise; Ada County Campus
 Treasure Valley Community College, Caldwell, Idaho (TVCC) Ontario, Oregon; Main Campus Caldwell, Idaho; Caldwell Campus
 Northwest Lineman College (NLC), Kuna, Idaho
 Heavy Equipment Operator School of Idaho, Boise
 Stevens-Henager College, Boise, Idaho Nampa, Idaho
 Carrington College, Boise
 Broadview University, Meridian, Idaho
 University of Phoenix Meridian; Main Campus
 Boise Bible College, Boise

Major valley employers
 Micron Technology Boise, Nampa
 Saint Luke's Medical Centers Boise, Meridian, Eagle, Nampa
 Saint Alphonsus Regional Medical Centers Boise, Nampa, Caldwell, Ontario
 Simplot Boise, Caldwell
 Hewlett-Packard Garden City / Boise
 Blue Cross Blue Shield Association Meridian
 Union Pacific Railroad Nampa
 T-Mobile US Meridian
 DirecTV Boise
 Teleperformance Boise

See also
 Idaho census statistical areas

References

External links

 Demographic and Income Profile

 
Metropolitan areas of Idaho
Regions of Idaho